Angel Dust is the third studio album by Blutengel and the first featuring Constance Rudert and Eva Pölzing as female vocalists. Vampire Romance Part I was released as a single preceding the album.

Track listing

Credits
 All tracks written and produced by Christian "Chris" Pohl
 Additional loops by Jens Gärtner
 Male vocals by Chris Pohl
 Female vocals on "Vampire Romance part I", "Our Time," "Black Wedding" and "Vampire Romance part II" by Constance Rudert
 Female vocals on "Wonderland" and "Angel of the Night," by Eva Pölzing
 Female vocals on "Keine Ewigkeit" by Constance Rudert and Eva Pölzing

Bonus CD
 Female vocals on "Her Song" by Constance Rudert

References

External links
 

2002 albums
Blutengel albums